"Antes muerta que sencilla" (English: "I'd rather be dead than plain") is a song composed and written by Spanish singer María Isabel in 2004, when she was 9 years old. It was the Spanish entry at the  Junior Eurovision Song Contest 2004 and it won the competition with a then record total of 171 points. It later became a huge hit in Spain, Latin America, Japan, and it was also a top ten hit in France and a top twenty in Switzerland. She performed the song on various shows as a guest star.

A cover version was recorded by Regional Mexican band Los Horóscopos de Durango and became popular among the Duranguense scene, gaining huge success in the United States and Mexico.  The same title was used for their 2005 album.

Charts

References 

Junior Eurovision Song Contest winning songs
Los Horóscopos de Durango songs
2004 singles
Spanish songs
María Isabel songs
2004 songs
Universal Music Group singles